George Bernhardt Textor (December 27, 1886 - March 10, 1954) was a Major League Baseball catcher.

External links

Major League Baseball catchers
Indianapolis Hoosiers players
Newark Peppers players
Vicksburg Hill Billies players
Canton Chinamen players
Akron Champs players
Lima Cigarmakers players
Mansfield Brownies players
Canton Statesmen players
Indianapolis Hoosiers (minor league) players
Hartford Senators players
Muskegon Reds players
Baseball players from Kentucky
1886 births
1954 deaths